Paradise is a surname. Notable people with the surname include:

 Bob Paradise (born 1944), American ice hockey player
 Dick Paradise (born 1945), American ice hockey player
 Jack Paradise (1925–2021), American pediatrician
 Michelle Paradise (born 1972), American writer, producer, and actress